Bray Park is a town located in north-eastern New South Wales, Australia, in the Tweed Shire.

Demographics

The median age of the Bray Park population was 40 years, 3 years above the national median of 37.

84.6% of people living in Bray Park were born in Australia. The other top responses for country of birth were New Zealand 2.3%, England 1.8%, India 0.7%, France 0.4%, China 0.4%.

90.5% of people spoke only English at home; the next most common languages were 0.7% Punjabi, 0.7% Bisaya, 0.6% Cantonese, 0.5% French, 0.4% Spanish.

References 

Suburbs of Tweed Heads, New South Wales